Hallucination Engine is a 1994 album by the New York based music group Material. The album mixes jazz, dub, funk and Indian music.

"Mantra" was issued as a 12" and CD single in 1993 (Axiom / Island, AXMCD1) featuring a 17-minute "Praying Mantra Mix" by The Orb, the album's "Doors of Perception Mix", and a 5-minute edit.

A Tetsu Inoue mix of "Ruins" was included on the Axiom Ambient: Lost in the Translation album.

"Eternal Drift" was issued as a 12" single in 1994 (Axiom / Island, PR12 6901-1) featuring the album version with re-mixes "Tribal Remix" by Kupper and Hacker, "Construct Over Destiny Mix" by Bill Laswell and "Eternal Thaemlitz Curse Mix" by Terre Thaemlitz. The last two mixes were included on the Axiom Ambient: Lost in the Translation album.

William S. Burroughs reading of "Words of Advice for Young People" had appeared on his 1993 album Spare Ass Annie and other Tales (The Operator's Manual).

"Cucumber Slumber" is a cover of the Weather Report track from the 1974 album Mysterious Traveller.

Track listing
"Black Light" (Bill Laswell, Wayne Shorter) – 7:33
"Mantra" [Doors of Perception Mix] (Laswell, L. Shankar, Caroline) – 8:44
"Ruins" [Submutation Dub] (Laswell) – 8:54
"Eternal Drift" (Laswell, Nicky Skopelitis) – 7:35
"Words of Advice" (Laswell, William S. Burroughs) – 3:58
"Cucumber Slumber" [Fluxus Mix] (Joe Zawinul, Alphonso Johnson) – 7:30
"The Hidden Garden" (Laswell, Simon Shaheen, Skopelitis) / "Naima" (John Coltrane) – 13:00
"Shadows of Paradise" (Laswell, L. Shankar, Skopelitis) – 9:45

Personnel
Material
 Bill Laswell – basses, beats, loops, samples, etc.

Additional personnel
 Wayne Shorter – soprano and tenor saxophones
 William S. Burroughs – voice ("Words of Advice")
 Liu Sola – voice ("Eternal Drift")
 Simon Shaheen – violin and oud
 Nicky Skopelitis – acoustic and electric 6- and 12- string guitars, coral electric sitar, baglama and Fairlight CMI
 Bernie Worrell – electric piano, Hammond B-3 organ
 Bootsy Collins – space bass
 L. Shankar – electric violin
 Sly Dunbar – drum kit
 Jeff Bova – synthesizers
 Jihad Racy – ney
 Jonas Hellborg – acoustic bass guitar and fretless electric bass
 Zakir Hussain – tabla
 Trilok Gurtu – tabla
 Vikku Vinayakram – ghatam
 Fahim Dandan – voice ("The Hidden Garden")
 George Basil – qanoun
 Michael Baklouk – daff, tambourine
 Aïyb Dieng – chatan, congas, percussion
 [SA]-Hallucination

Production
 Recorded at Greenpoint Studio, BC Studio/Gowanus, Platinum Island Studio and Krypton Studio (New York) and Media Arts (Madras, India)
 Produced and arranged by Bill Laswell.
 Engineers Robert Musso, Oz Fritz and Martin Bisi
 Mixed by Robert Musso at Greenpoint Studio
 Cover by James Koehnline

Release history
 1994 – Axiom/Island/PolyGram 518 351
 1994 – Axiom/BMG, 74321-18190

References

External links 
 
 Hallucination Engine at Bandcamp

1994 albums
Material (band) albums
Albums produced by Bill Laswell
Axiom (record label) albums